MBJ may refer to:
 Sangster International Airport (IATA code MBJ), a major airport in Montego Bay, Jamaica.
Mississippi Business Journal, American newspaper
Michael B. Jordan, (born 1987) an American actor
 Mayurbhanj, a district in Odisha.